The Bay of Imsouane (Arabic: خليج امسوان) is a gulf of the west coast of Morocco in Imsouane on the Atlantic Ocean. 

The gulf is known to include the largest right point break in Morocco as well as a beach break spot, also called Cathedral Point. It also has a small port that is mostly used for traditional fishing.

Gallery

See also 

 Imsouane

References 

Bays of Africa